Veerabhadrappa Kumbar, popularly known by the pen name KumVee, is an Indian novelist, poet, story writer and critic in the Kannada-language. He was awarded the Sahitya Akademi Award in 2007 for his work Aramane.

Early life 

KumVee was born on 1 October 1953 in Kotturu, a town in Bellary District of Karnataka to Kumbar Halappa and Kotramma. KumVee's family members includes wife Annapoorna and sons Purarava (elder), Shalivahana and younger son Pravara.

Career 

KumVee taught Kannada in many schools for 35 years in the neighboring state of Andhra Pradesh. After retirement he move to his native Kotturu with his family.

Writing Style 

He uses the local Ballary dialet of Kannada in his writings to convey the sensitivities of the life he experienced. This is the main strength of KumVee's writing.

Books

Collection of poems 

 Divi seemeya Haadu
 Rajanaramanege Kavya

Story/ Collection of Stories 
Raayalaseema
Nigi Nigi Hagalu
Manne Modalu
Koole
Koormavathara 
Doma Mattitara Kathegalu
Bhaalare Vichitram
Inaadaroo Saayabeku
Kumvee Ayda Kathegalu
Bhagavathi Kaadu
 Karivemala
Apoorva Chintamani Kathe
Sushile Emba Naayiyoi Vaagili Emba Graamavoo
Enter the Dragon
 KumVee Bareda Kathegalu
 Idu Bari Katheyallo Anna
 Kum Vee 70 Kathe 50

Novels 

Hemareddy mallammana Katheyu
Ekaambara
Kappu
Beli mattu Hola
Aasthi
Kotra Highschoolige Seriddu
Yaapillu
Shyamanna
Kendada Male
Bete
Pakshigalu
Pratidwandi
Hanuma
Aramane
Beliya Hoogalu
Aarohana
Nijalinga
 Kattegondu Kaala
 Kilubu
 Shwaanaavalambanakari
 Ello Jogappa Ninnaramane
 Encounter
 Jai Bhajarangabali

Biographies 

Chaplin
Rahula saakrutsayana
Neetaji Subhasha Chandra Bose
Subhadramma mansur
Sri Krishna Devaraya

Autobiography 

 Gandhi Classu

Translation
Chinnda tene
 Telugu Kathegalu
Ondu Peeligeya Telugu Kathegalu
Tanna maarga  ( Stories of Dr Abburi Chayadevi)

All the above four Translations have been published by "Sahitya Akademi, New Delhi" . In addition to this, KumVee has Translated more than 300 stories from many languages.

Edits

 Kathegalu-1989

Work in Visual Media

 Manamechhida Hudugi
 Dore 
 Kotreshi Kanasu
 Kendada Male
 Koormavatara 
 Bhagavati Kaadu
 Beli mattu Hola

Noted Awards
 Rajyotsava Prashasti
 Honorary Doctorate from Karnataka University of Dharwad
 Sahitya Akademi Award (2007) - Returned in October 2015 on protest for intolerance in India.
 Nrupatunga Award
 Karnataka Sahitya Academy Award Awarded Thrice.

References 

Kannada-language writers
Kannada poets
Kannada people
1953 births
Living people
Recipients of the Rajyotsava Award 2004
Recipients of the Sahitya Akademi Award in Kannada